Sonceboz-Sombeval railway station is a railway station in the municipality of Sonceboz-Sombeval, in the Swiss canton of Bern. It is located at the junction of the standard gauge Biel/Bienne–La Chaux-de-Fonds and Sonceboz-Sombeval–Moutier lines of Swiss Federal Railways.

Services
The following services stop at Sonceboz-Sombeval:

 Regio:

References

External links 
 
 

Railway stations in the canton of Bern
Swiss Federal Railways stations